John Leckie Cattanach (May 10, 1863 – November 10, 1926) was an American Major League Baseball player who pitched three games during his only season, 1884. He pitched in one game for the Providence Grays of the National League, and two other games for the St. Louis Maroons of the Union Association. He finished with a win–loss record of 1–1, with a 3.68 earned run average and 15 strikeouts in 22 innings pitched. After his baseball career, he became a well known boxer and oarsman, and in his father's business became a chemist. He died in his hometown of Providence, Rhode Island at the age of 63, and is interred at Oak Grove Cemetery in Pawtucket, Rhode Island.

References

External links

1863 births
1926 deaths
19th-century baseball players
Baseball players from Providence, Rhode Island
Major League Baseball pitchers
Providence Grays players
St. Louis Maroons players
Willimantic (minor league baseball) players
Columbus Stars (baseball) players